Irma Stern (2 October 1894 – 23 August 1966) was a major South African artist who achieved national and international recognition in her lifetime.

Life 
Stern was born in Schweizer-Reneke, a small town in the Transvaal, of German-Jewish parents. Her father was interned in a concentration camp by the British during the Second Boer War because of his pro-Boer leanings. Irma and her younger brother, Rudi, were thus taken to Cape Town by their mother. In 1901, the family returned to Germany and later would constantly travel between South Africa and Germany. This travel also influenced Irma's development as an artist.

In 1913 Stern studied art in Germany at the Weimar Academy, in 1914 at the Levin-Funcke Studio and notably from 1917 with Max Pechstein, a founder of the Novembergruppe. Stern was associated with the German Expressionist painters of this period. She held her first exhibition in Berlin in 1919. In 1920 Stern returned to Cape Town with her family, where she was first derided and dismissed as an artist before later becoming an established artist by the 1940s.

In 1926 Stern married Johannes Prinz, her former tutor, who subsequently became professor of German at the University of Cape Town. They were divorced in 1934.

Irma Stern travelled extensively in Europe and explored southern Africa, Zanzibar and the Congo region. These trips provided a wide range of subject matter for her paintings and gave her opportunities to acquire and assemble a collection of artifacts. Stern's intention was to travel extensively in her lifetime: in 1931 to Madeira, in 1937 and 1938 to Dakar, Senegal, 1939 and 1945 Zanzibar, the Congo region in 1942, 1946 and 1955, 1952 Madeira, 1952 Israel, 1955 Turkey, 1960 Spain and 1963 France. Stern also travelled extensively in South Africa, for example in 1926 to Swaziland and Pondoland, in 1933 to Namaqualand, in 1936 generally, and in 1941 to the Eastern Cape. Stern refused to either travel or exhibit in Germany during the period of the Nazi regime from 1933 to 1945. These expeditions resulted in a wealth of artistic creativity and energy as well as the publication of two illustrated journals: Congo, published in 1943 and Zanzibar in 1948.

Reception 
Almost one hundred solo exhibitions were held during her lifetime both in South Africa and Europe, including Germany, France, Italy and England. Although accepted in Europe, her work was unappreciated at first in South Africa, where critics derided her early exhibitions in the 1920s with reviews titled such as "Art of Miss Irma Stern - Ugliness as a cult".

The Irma Stern Museum was established in 1971 and is the house the artist lived in for almost four decades. She moved into The Firs in Rondebosch in 1927 and lived there until her death. Several of the rooms are furnished as she arranged them while upstairs there is a commercial gallery used by contemporary South African artists.

On 8 May 2000, one of her works sold at Sotheby's South Africa in Johannesburg for an all-time record of R1.7 million. This record was soon broken, however, and in March 2007, her 1936 Portrait of an Indian woman was sold for R6.6 million. Stern's Gladioli was sold for an all-time high of R13.3 million in October 2010, but was then followed by the sale of Bahora Girl for R26.7 million later that month - both were also records for sales of South African art at the time. A new South African record was set in March 2011, when a Stern painting sold for R34 million at Bonhams, London.

On 11 November 2012, Stern's painting Fishing Boats was stolen along with four other paintings from a museum in Pretoria. A tip-off led South African police to a cemetery in Port Elizabeth, where four of the five paintings were recovered from under a bench.

From 3 November 2021 to 1 August 2022, the Norval Foundation gallery in Cape Town presents important paintings produced by Irma Stern during her two stays in Zanzibar during the period of 1939 to 1945, and commented on these works as follows:

Gallery

Bibliography 
 At home with Irma Stern: A guidebook to the UCT Irma Stern Museum, by Helene Smuts 
 Hidden Treasures: Irma Stern – Her Books, Painted Book Covers and Bookplates, by Irene Below 
 Irma Stern: A Feast for the Eye, by Marion Arnold 
 Irma Stern and the Racial Paradox of South African Modern Art: Audacities of Color, by LaNitra M. Berger 
 Irma Stern: The Early Years (1894–1933), by Karel Schoeman 
 Paradise, the Journal and Letters (1917–1933) of Irma Stern Edited with a Commentary, by Neville Dubow 
 Remembering Irma: Irma Stern: A Memoir with Letters''.

References

External links 

 Irma Stern Museum

1894 births
1966 deaths
20th-century South African women artists
South African Jews
Jewish artists
White South African people
South African people of German-Jewish descent